Hando Nahkur (born 7 July 1982) is an Estonian pianist.

Since 2006, he is a member of Association of Estonian Professional Musicians.

Awards
He has won several national and international awards:
 First Prize in the Estonian National Piano Competition (Estonia)
 National Winner of Eurovision Young Musicians (Austria)
 Special Prize winner in the Tchaikovsky International Piano Competition (Russia)
 Recipient of the Harold Von Mickwitz Prize (USA) 
 Golden Medal of Merit (Canada)
 Diplomat of Nation Certificate of Merit (Estonia)

References

Living people
1982 births
Estonian pianists